Street Safari is the second studio album by American band Public Access T.V. The album was released on 23 February 2018 via Cinematic. Several singles and music videos were released prior the album, including "MetroTech" and "Lost in the Game". The album received critical acclaim. The band supported it by several tours of the United States and Europe.

Track listing

References

2018 albums
Public Access T.V. albums